Mikine Kuwahara (桑原幹根, Kuwahara Mikune, August 29, 1895 – April 11, 1991) was a Japanese Home Ministry government official. He was born in Yamanashi Prefecture. He was a graduate of the University of Tokyo. He was twice governor of Aichi Prefecture. He was a recipient of the Order of the Rising Sun.

1895 births
1991 deaths
Japanese Home Ministry government officials
Governors of Aichi Prefecture
University of Tokyo alumni
Politicians from Yamanashi Prefecture
Grand Cordons of the Order of the Rising Sun